The Lordship of Mechelen was until 1795 a small authonomous Lordship in the Low Countries, consisting of the city of Mechelen and some surrounding villages.

History 
In the early Middle Ages, it was part of the Prince-Bishopric of Liège, which was confirmed in 910. In practice, the area was ruled by the local Huis Berthout family, against the will of the Prince-Bishops of Liège. The Duchy of Brabant tried to annex the Lordship, but as a reaction, Liège gave the area in 1333 to the County of Flanders. The Flemish also didn't gain complete and permanent control.

Mechelen was therefore later considered one of the Seventeen Provinces and then as a province of the Southern Netherlands. The Dukes of Burgundy and later the Habsburg Emperors and Kings were personally Lords of Mechelen and for a while turned the city more or less into the capital of the Netherlands. They established here the highest jurisdictional court of the Seventeen Provinces, called the Great Council of Mechelen. Governess Margaret of Austria also held her Court at Mechelen. Later, the capital moved primarily to Brussels.

In 1795 the Lordship was abolished by the French revolutionaries and it became part of the French département of the Deux-Nèthes.
Today it is part of the Belgian province of Antwerp.

Areas of the Lordship of Mechelen 
 the walled city of Mechelen
 the hamlets Nekkerspoel, Nieuwland, Pennepoel, Battel, Geerdegem and others
 the villages of Hever, Muizen, Hombeek, Leest and Heffen
 In a separate enclave, Heist-op-den-Berg and some hamlets like Gestel.

References

External links 
 Geschiedenis van de Stad en de Heerlykheid van Mechelen (1854)

 
Mechelen
History of Mechelen
1795 disestablishments
Mechelen